Jordan K. Hubbard (born April 8, 1963) is an open source software developer, authoring software such as the Ardent Window Manager and various other open source tools and libraries before co-founding the FreeBSD project with Nate Williams and Rodney W. Grimes in 1993, for which he contributed the initial FreeBSD Ports collection, package management system and sysinstall. In July 2001 Hubbard joined Apple Computer in the role of manager of the BSD technology group, during which time he was one of the creators of MacPorts.  In 2005, his title was "Director of UNIX Technology" and in October 2007, Hubbard was promoted to "Director of Engineering of Unix Technologies" at Apple where he remained until June 2013.

On July 15, 2013, he became CTO of iXsystems where he also led the FreeNAS open source project.

On March 24, 2017, he announced his plan to depart from iXsystems and that he would be joining TwoPoreGuys, a Biotechnology company, as VP of Engineering.  From January 2019 - April 2020 he was part of the Engineering Leadership team at Uber and, as of April 2020, is currently Sr. Director for GPU Compute SW at NVidia.

rwall incident 
On March 31, 1987 Hubbard executed an rwall command expecting it to send a message to every machine on the network at University of California, Berkeley, where he headed the Distributed Unix Group. The command instead began broadcasting Hubbard's message to every machine on the internet and was stopped after Hubbard realised the message was being broadcast remotely after he received complaints from people at Purdue University and University of Texas. Even though the command was terminated, it resulted in Hubbard receiving 743 messages and complaints.

References

External links 
 My Broadcast [The UNIX rwall problem] - ACM Risks Digest - April 2, 1987
 History of FreeBSD project
 WorkingMac interview (retrieved from archive.org) - August 16, 2001
 MacSlash interview (retrieved from archive.org) - December 17, 2002
 OSNews interview - April 15, 2003
 Face to Face with Jordan Hubbard, BSDi (retrieved from archive.org) - February 11, 2000
 Salon: Open-sourcing the Apple (retrieved from archive.org) - Jordan initial reactions to the first time he used Mac OS X (November 17, 2000)
 Open Source to the Core - May 1, 2005
 Apple’s Operating System Guru Goes Back to His Roots - Aug 9, 2013
 Feb 20th, 2017 4:05 PM EST, John Martellaro, The Mac Observer, TMO Background Mode: Interview with Open Source Developer & Former Apple Manager Jordan Hubbard

1963 births
Apple Inc. employees
Free software programmers
FreeBSD people
Living people
People from Boulder Creek, California